Pont Minllyn (also known as Pont-y-Ffinant or Pontrusk Bridge) is a bridge spanning the Afon Dyfi, north of the village of Mallwyd, in Gwynedd, Wales. It was built by John Davies, rector of Mallwyd between 1603 and 1644 and a famed Welsh scholar who wrote a Welsh grammar and worked on early Welsh translations of the Bible and the Book of Common Prayer. Pont Minllyn was designed as a packhorse bridge to facilitate the transportation of goods. It is a Grade II listed building and a Scheduled monument.

History and description
Dr John Davies (c. 1567–1644) was born in Llanferres, Denbighshire, and graduated from Jesus College, Oxford, in 1594. In 1604 he was appointed rector at Mallwyd, Gwynedd, where he served until his death in 1644. He is believed to have been the main editor and reviser of the 1620 edition of the Welsh translation of the Bible and the 1621 edition of the Welsh translation of the Book of Common Prayer. The Gwynedd Pevsner records him as having paid for the construction of three bridges in the vicinity of Mallwyd.

Pont Minllyn was designed as a packhorse bridge to assist in the transportation of goods. It consists of two arches, with a central pier in the river, constructed from stone rubble. The span of the bridge is now turfed, Pevsner describing the "grassy arches of marvellous delicacy". Cadw dates the bridge to around the 1630s, but Pevsner suggests it is a later replacement for a wooden bridge constructed for Davies. The Ancient Monuments website suggests that the original wooden bridge predates Davies, noting that it is shown on a map of 1578 in the 
Atlas of the Counties of England and Wales produced by Christopher Saxton. Pont Minllyn is both a Grade II listed structure and a Scheduled monument.

Footnotes

References

Sources
 

Bridges in Gwynedd
Packhorse bridges
Grade II listed buildings in Gwynedd
Cadw